Pasand TV is a Free-to-air Hindi/Bhojpuri language entertainment channel that was owned by OSM Network. This channel shows some Hindi and Bhojpuri shows that taken from television channels like Sahara One and Mahuaa TV

Current shows

Music shows 
Gana Bajanaa

Devotional shows 
Dharam Katha
Maai Ke Mahima
Bhakti Dhara
Ram Katha

Hindi television shows 
Malini Iyer
Kesariya Balam Aavo Hamare Des
Chacha Chaudhary
Om Namah Shivay
Jap Tap Vrat

Bhojpuri television shows 
Sa-Se Sarssatti
Saatho Vanchanwa Nibaib Sajna
Jai Jai Shiv Shankar

Former shows 
Khandhan
Ganga Jamuna

References 

Hindi-language television channels in India
Television channels and stations established in 2021
Hindi-language television stations